The Woman Upstairs is a 1921 British drama film directed by Fred Paul and starring Joan Beverley and Frank Hill. It was part of a Grand Guignol series of films. It focuses on the relationship between a demi-mondaine and a newly married man.

Cast
 Joan Beverley - Rose, the demi-mondaine
 Frank Hill - Fred Ellsworthy, the husband

References

External links

1921 films
British silent short films
1921 drama films
Films directed by Fred Paul
British drama films
British black-and-white films
1920s English-language films
1920s British films
Silent drama films